Sarah Zadrazil (born 19 February 1993) is an Austrian footballer who plays as a midfielder for German club Bayern Munich and the Austria national team.

College career
Zadrazil played college soccer for the East Tennessee State  Buccaneers (ETSU) in the southeastern United States.  During her four years with the Buccaneers, Zadrazil broke several ETSU records.  Her freshman year she tied the single-season assists record for a freshman.  She was named to The Atlantic Sun Freshman of the Year.  She followed this impressive freshman year with a sophomore year that saw her score 8 goals and provide 11 assist, meriting her the 2013 Atlantic Sun Player of the Year.  Her junior year saw her become the ETSU career-leader in points, assists and shots attempted.  She was named to the Southern Conference All-First Team and All-Tournament Team and NSCAA All-Southern Region Second Team.  She finished her senior year being named to the NSCAA All-Southern Region Third team and became the first ever ETSU player to win the Southern Conference Player of the Year award. Zadrazil left ETSU as its career leader in points (101), assists (48), game-winning goals (11), shots attempted (213) and shots on goal (106). She graduated with a degree in exercise science.

Club career

Washington Spirit reserve
In 2015, Zadrazil helped the Washington Spirit reserve team win the 2015 W-League championship. While she went undrafted in the 2016 NWSL College Draft, Zadrazil was invited in March 2016 to attend the Washington Spirit pre-season training camp as an unsigned player. Later in March 2016 she accepted an invitation to join Portland Thorns FC's training camp.

Turbine Potsdam
Zadrazil agreed a two-year contract with German Frauen-Bundesliga club Turbine Potsdam in May 2016. In December 2017, she extended her contract with Potsdam until June 30, 2020.

In December 2018, Zadrazil won the inaugural Austrian Footballer of the Year award, voted by Austrian Press Agency DiePresse. Austrian Footballer of the Year She subsequently won the 2018–19 Salzburger Leonidas Sportwoman of the Year award.

Bayern Munich
In June 2020, Zadrazil signed a three-year contract with Bayern Munich.

International career 
Zadrazil made her debut for the Austria national team in a match against Turkey in 2010. In April 2016, she scored in a 6–1 victory over Kazakhstan.  She helped Austria to a 2016 Cyprus Cup win, scoring once in the game against Hungary.  She was part of the Austrian squad which reached the 2017 UEFA Women's Euro semifinal.

International goals 
Scores and results list Austria's goal tally first.

Honours

Club

Bayern Munich 

 Bundesliga: 2020-21

Austria
 Cyprus Women's Cup: Winner 2016

Individual
2018 Austrian Footballer of the Year
2018–19 Salzburger Leonidas Sportwoman of the Year

We Play Strong
Zadrazil is one of UEFA's official ambassadors for #WePlayStrong, a social media and vlogging campaign which was launched in 2018.  The campaign's  "...aim is to promote women’s football as much as we can and to make people aware of women’s football, really,” Evans, another participant explains. “The ultimate goal is to make football the most played sport by females by 2020. So it’s a UEFA initiative to get more women and girls playing football, whether they want to be professional or not.”  The series, which also originally included professional footballers Lisa Evans, Eunice Beckmann, Laura Feiersinger and now also includes Petronella Ekroth and Shanice van de Sanden, follows the daily lives of female professional footballers.

Social media
Instagram
Twitter

References

External links

 
 Profile at East Tennessee State University

1993 births
Living people
Austrian women's footballers
Expatriate women's soccer players in the United States
Austrian expatriate women's footballers
Austrian expatriate sportspeople in the United States
Austria women's international footballers
USL W-League (1995–2015) players
East Tennessee State University alumni
1. FFC Turbine Potsdam players
Expatriate women's footballers in Germany
Austrian expatriate sportspeople in Germany
East Tennessee State Buccaneers women's soccer players
Women's association football midfielders
Frauen-Bundesliga players
Footballers from Salzburg (state)
People from Salzburg-Umgebung District
FC Bayern Munich (women) players
UEFA Women's Euro 2022 players
FIFA Century Club
UEFA Women's Euro 2017 players